Jan Němeček (born February 14, 1976) is a Czech former professional ice hockey defenceman. He was drafted 215th overall in the 1994 NHL Entry Draft by the Los Angeles Kings and played seven games in the National Hockey League for the Kings, scoring one goal.

Career statistics

External links
 

1976 births
Living people
Bolzano HC players
Czech ice hockey defencemen
EK Zell am See players
EHC Freiburg players
Fredericton Canadiens players
HC Karlovy Vary players
Hull Olympiques players
IHC Písek players
Leksands IF players
Long Beach Ice Dogs (IHL) players
Los Angeles Kings draft picks
Los Angeles Kings players
Mississippi Sea Wolves players
Motor České Budějovice players
Nürnberg Ice Tigers players
Odense Bulldogs players
Sportspeople from Písek
Phoenix Roadrunners (IHL) players
Piráti Chomutov players
Ritten Sport players
SHC Fassa players
Timrå IK players
VEU Feldkirch players
Czech expatriate ice hockey players in the United States
Czech expatriate ice hockey players in Canada
Czech expatriate ice hockey players in Germany
Czech expatriate ice hockey players in Sweden
Czech expatriate sportspeople in Austria
Czech expatriate sportspeople in Italy
Czech expatriate sportspeople in Denmark
Expatriate ice hockey players in Austria
Expatriate ice hockey players in Italy
Expatriate ice hockey players in Denmark